Standings and results for Group 5 of the UEFA Euro 2000 qualifying tournament.

Standings

Matches

Goalscorers

References

Group 5
qual
1998–99 in English football
1999–2000 in Polish football
1998–99 in Polish football
1998–99 in Bulgarian football
1999–2000 in Bulgarian football
1998–99 in Luxembourgian football
1999–2000 in Luxembourgian football
1999 in Swedish football
1998 in Swedish football
Sweden at UEFA Euro 2000